The Kučinskis cabinet was the government of Latvia from 11 February 2016 to 23 January 2019.

The stated objectives of the cabinet were to develop the economy, state security, education and health reform, the living standards of families, and social security.

References

Government of Latvia
2016 establishments in Latvia
Cabinets established in 2016
2019 disestablishments in Latvia
Cabinets disestablished in 2019